The Wiseman hypothesis, sometimes called the tablet theory, is a  theory of the authorship and composition of the Book of Genesis which suggests that Moses compiled Genesis from tablets handed down through Abraham and the other patriarchs. Originally advocated by P. J. Wiseman (1888–1948) in his New discoveries in Babylonia about Genesis (1936) and republished by Wiseman's son, Donald Wiseman, as Ancient records and the structure of Genesis: A case for literary unity in 1985, the hypothesis received some support from R. K. Harrison (1969) but otherwise remained without acceptance in scholarly circles.

History

P. J. Wiseman
Air Commodore P. J. Wiseman, a British officer who visited many active archaeological sites during his career in the Middle East, found that ancient narrative tablets usually ended in colophons which had a very specific format consisting of three parts; 1) "this has been the history/book/genealogy  of...", 2) the name of the person who wrote or owned the tablet, and 3) a date (such as "in the year of the great earthquake," or "the 3rd year of king so-and-so", etc. What Wiseman brought new to the table was the idea that these apparent colophons indicated that Genesis had originally been a collection of narrative clay tablets written in cuneiform, like the ancient tablets he had seen, which Moses had edited into a single document on parchment or papyrus. This is in contrast with traditional views that Moses wrote Genesis entirely on his own without any outside sources and with the Documentary hypothesis that Genesis was compiled by much later and unknown redactors.

Just as the colophons came at the end of the narratives, so too, the s may come at the end of narratives. Thus the first of these  passages, Genesis 2:4, refers to the preceding Creation account beginning in Genesis 1, rather than being the introduction to the succeeding account.

In his Creation Revealed in Six Days, P. J. Wiseman argued that the days of creation represented the time period in which God took to reveal his work of creation, and that Genesis 1 "is an account of what 'God said' about the things 'God made'... it is His revelation to men about His creative acts in time past."

R. K. Harrison
R. K. Harrison in his Introduction to the Old Testament wrote approvingly of [Wiseman's] approach which "had the distinct advantage of relating the ancient Mesopotamian sources underlying Genesis to an authentic Mesopotamian life-situation, unlike the attempts of the Graf–Wellhausen school, and showed that the methods of writing and compilation employed in Genesis were in essential harmony with the processes current among the scribes of ancient Babylonia."

Harrison noted that these examples had been discounted by scholars who follow Wellhausen and the Documentary hypothesis, since the central basis of the Documentary hypothesis is that the Pentateuch is mostly a work composed by unknown editors and authors who lived much later than the time of Moses.

Donald Wiseman
Donald Wiseman noted in the foreword to the revised edition of his father's book that since it had first been written (1936) many more colophons have been discovered among Babylonian cuneiform texts which substantiated the use of this scribal device. Texts from Syria and Mesopotamia show continuity in tradition of scribal education and literary practices for more than two millennia, giving fixed and dated points.  He particularly valued the implication of this theory for the early use of writing.  Genesis 1-37 could be a transcript of the oldest written records.

Tablets in Genesis
This is a breakdown of Genesis into 'tablets' delineated by colophons according to Wiseman's theory.

Reception
Biblical scholar Victor Hamilton states that Wiseman's hypothesis was "the first concerted attempt to challenge the hypothesis" of introductory colophons. Hamilton does however identify several problems with what he terms the "Wiseman-Harrison approach". Firstly, "in five instances where the formula precedes a genealogy ..., it is difficult not to include the colophon with what follows." Secondly, the approach requires the "unlikely" explanation that "Ishmael was responsible for preserving the history of Abraham", Isaac for Ishmael's history, Esau for Jacob's and Jacob for Esau's. The third problem he identifies is that Genesis is narrative, not biographical, as that approach would suggest.

Herbert M. Wolf describes the theory as "an attractive one", but suggests that it has "serious shortcomings". Firstly, he suggests that  almost always fit more naturally with the verses that they precede than with the verses that precede them. Secondly he doubts if Moses would be able to read writing made before the Tower of Babel. Thirdly he also suggests that the pairings of preservers and preserved histories are "unlikely", given the "rivalry and jealousy" involved and the lack of contact between Esau and Jacob.

Books

See also

 Mosaic authorship
 Documentary hypothesis
 Lower criticism
 Biblical criticism
 Dating the Bible

Footnotes

References

Further reading

 Hamilton, Donald L., Homiletical Handbook, p. 141, Broadman and Holmann Publishers, 1992.
 Taylor, Charles, Who Wrote Genesis? Are the Toledoth Colophons?, Journal of Creation, Aug 1994.
 Woudstra, Marten, The Toledot of the Book of Genesis and Their Redemptive-Historical Significance, Calvin Theological Seminary, 1980.

Biblical criticism
Book of Genesis
Hypotheses